En Aasai Machan is a 1994 Indian Tamil-language drama film written and directed by R. Sundarrajan. The film stars Vijayakanth, Murali, Revathi and Ranjitha. It was released on 26 August 1994.

Plot 

Subramani, the college leader, falls in love with Meenakshi, but she requests him to complete her challenges to accept his love. Subramani succeeds her challenges, and when she asks him to kiss her in public, he is arrested by a police officer. Aarusamy, Subramani's brother, the respected village chief, lives with Thayamma. In the past, Subramani's mother died during Subramani's childbirth. Aarusamy and Thayamma got engaged when they were children. They stayed unmarried to take care of Subramani.

Subramani is later released from jail. Meenakshi's uncle Thangarasu wants to marry her, and he then beats up Aarusamy. Later, Thayamma decides to work in Meenakshi's house to spy on her. Meenakshi admits to Thayamma that she is in love with Subramani. Thangarasu agrees for Meenakshi and Subramani's marriage. Finally, Subramani and Meenakshi get married, but they discover that Thayamma has died.

It is revealed that on the day before, Thangarasu humiliated Aarusamy to take revenge, and Aarusamy accepted it for his brother's marriage. Unable to bear this torture, Thayamma dies watching him. The film ends with Aarusamy marrying Thayamma before carrying her dead body off to perform her last rites.

Cast 

Vijayakanth as Aarusamy
Murali as Subramani
Revathi as Thayamma (Maragadham)
Monica as Younger Thayamma
Ranjitha as Meenakshi
Kazan Khan as Thangarasu, Meenakshi's uncle
Ganthimathi as Kaveri
Radha Ravi as Police Officer
R. Sundarrajan
Thalapathy Dinesh as Dinesh
Balu Anand as Nachimuthu
Kovai Senthil
Nellai Siva
Selladurai
Kokila

Soundtrack 

The music was composed by Deva, with lyrics written by Vaali, Gangai Amaran and Kalidasan.

Reception 
INDOlink wrote "A brilliant performance by Revathi notwithstanding, En Aasai Machaan, the come back vehicle of director R.Sunderrajan fails to grip the viewer with the narration slipping on many occasions". K. Vijiyan of New Straits Times wrote that while the film had a promising start, it "ends up being disappointing". Thulasi of Kalki said this film is for those who like emotional films. Revathi won the Cinema Express Award for Best Actress – Tamil, and Monica won the Tamil Nadu State Film Award for Best Child Artist.

References

External links 

 

1994 films
Films scored by Deva (composer)
1990s Tamil-language films
Films directed by R. Sundarrajan
1994 drama films
Indian drama films